Stone is a small village in the parish of Ham and Stone, Gloucestershire, England. It is adjacent to the county boundary with South Gloucestershire. The part of the community just north-east of the river is called Woodford. In 2019 it had an estimated population of 527.

The village of Stone has a church, a village green, a Church of England primary school and a village hall. The village also had  a pub, the Berkeley Vale Hotel, but this was closed in 2013 and has been redeveloped.

Also to the north lies the village of Newport.

Governance
The village is part of 'Vale' electoral ward. This ward stretches from Stone north easterly on the line of the M5 motorway to Stinchcombe. The total ward population taken at the 2011 census was 1,879.

References

External links

 HamAndStone.com – Village web site

Villages in Gloucestershire
Stroud District